The 1923–24 Michigan Wolverines men's basketball team represented the University of Michigan in intercollegiate basketball during the 1923–24 season. The team compiled a record of 10–7. E. J. Mather was in his fifth year as the team's coach, and Howard M. Birks was the team captain.

Players
Howard M. "Hoppy" Birks, Chicago, Illinois - team captain, center and varsity letter winner
Royal F. Cherry, Grand Rapids, Michigan - guard and varsity letter winner
Roy F. Deng, Mt. Clemens, Michigan - guard and varsity letter winner
Richard F. Doyle, Galesburg, Michigan - center and varsity letter winner
George Haggarty, Ypsilanti, Michigan - forward and varsity letter winner
William P. "Bill" Henderson, Detroit, Michigan - forward and varsity letter winner
Fay Kendrick - aMa letter winner
Harry Kipke, Lansing, Michigan - guard and varsity letter winner
Carl C. Kresbach, Monroe, Michigan - aMa letter winner
Joseph M. Landre, Binghamton, New York - aMa letter winner
Edward D. Line, Detroit, Michigan - forward and varsity letter winner
Arthur B. "Bus" McWood - center and varsity letter winner
Kenneth Morgaridge, Chicago, Illinois - forward and varsity letter winner
Irwin Stegmeier, Grand Rapids, Michigan - aMa letter winner

Coaching staff
E. J. Mather - coach
Ralph E. Wright - manager
Fielding H. Yost - athletic director

References

Michigan
Michigan Wolverines men's basketball seasons
Michigan Wolverines basketball
Michigan Wolverines basketball